Johann Sebastian Bach composed the church cantata  (Whoever exalts himself, will be abased / KJV: For whosoever exalteth himself shall be abased), 47, in Leipzig for the 17th Sunday after Trinity and first performed it on 13 October 1726.

History and words 
Bach wrote the cantata in his fourth year in Leipzig for the 17th Sunday after Trinity. It is regarded as part of his third annual cycle of cantatas. The prescribed readings for the Sunday were from the Epistle to the Ephesians, the admonition to keep the unity of the Spirit, and from the Gospel of Luke, healing a man with dropsy on the Sabbath. The poet Johann Friedrich Helbig (1680–1722) was a court poet at the ducal court of Saxe-Eisenach from 1718. He published an annual cycle of cantatas in 1720,  (Encouragement of Devotion), which included this cantata. It is the only cantata text of Helbig which Bach composed. It is not known whether he knew the publishing or rather a composition of Georg Philipp Telemann, who composed several of Helbig's texts in Eisenach. The poet takes the final line from the Gospel as a starting point in the first movement and then concentrates on the warning of pride, leading to a prayer for humility. The closing chorale is the eleventh and final stanza of the hymn "", which Bach had used in 1723 in his cantata .

Bach first performed the cantata on 13 October 1726.

Scoring and structure 
The cantata in five movements is scored for two vocal soloists (soprano and bass), a four-part choir, and a Baroque instrumental ensemble of two oboes, two violins, viola, organ obbligato and basso continuo.

Music 
The opening chorus is the most elaborate of the five movements. Bach used for the long ritornello music from his organ prelude in C minor, BWV 546, transposed to G minor. The oboes play a motif, rising in sequences, which becomes a vocal theme of a fugue, illustrating the haughty self-exaltation in the first half of the Gospel text. A countersubject moves in the opposite direction to illustrate the self-humiliation. The fugue is concluded by a homophonic "summary". The sequence of fugue and summary is repeated. Finally, the complete ritornello is repeated like a da capo, but with the voices additionally embedded, stating the complete text once more in homophony.

The soprano aria was originally accompanied by an obbligato organ, as was, three weeks later, the aria Ich geh und suche mit Verlangen, BWV 49. In a later performance of the cantata, Bach assigned the obbligato part to a violin. The da capo aria depicts humility in the first section, pride in the middle section, in rough rhythm both in the voice as in the obbligato, whereas the continuo plays the theme from the first section to unify the movement. John Eliot Gardiner describes the "harsh, stubborn broken chords" as illustrating arrogance. The only recitative, accompanied by the strings, is the central movement. Gardiner observes that Bach's "autograph score shows, for example, how he sharpened the rhythm of the word "" (devil's brood) to make its impact more abrupt and brutal." The second aria is in three parts, but without a vocal da capo. Oboe and violin are equal partners to the bass voice in a prayer for humility. The closing chorale is set for four parts in utmost humility.

Recordings 
 J. S. Bach: Cantata BWV 10, BWV 47; Sanctus BWV 241, Paul Steinitz, London Bach Society, English Chamber Orchestra, Sally Le Sage, Neil Howlett, Oryx 1965
 J. S. Bach: Cantata No. 47; W.A. Mozart: Missa Brevis, Rudolf Barshai, Yurlov Choir, Moscow Chamber Orchestra, Galina Pisarenko; Bass: Alexander Vedernikov, Melodiya 1966
 J. S. Bach: Das Kantatenwerk – Sacred Cantatas Vol. 3, Nikolaus Harnoncourt, Wiener Sängerknaben,  Concentus Musicus Wien, soloist of the Wiener Sängerknaben, Ruud van der Meer, Teldec 1974
 Die Bach Kantate Vol. 53, Helmuth Rilling, Gächinger Kantorei, Bach-Collegium Stuttgart, Arleen Augér, Philippe Huttenlocher, Hänssler 1982
 Bach Edition Vol. 14 – Cantatas Vol. 7, Pieter Jan Leusink, Holland Boys Choir, Netherlands Bach Collegium, Ruth Holton, Bas Ramselaar, Brilliant Classics 2000
 Bach Cantatas Vol. 9: Lund / Leipzig / For the 17th Sunday after Trinity / For the 18th Sunday after Trinity, John Eliot Gardiner, Monteverdi Choir, English Baroque Soloists, Katharine Fuge, Stephan Loges, Soli Deo Gloria 2000
 J. S. Bach: Complete Cantatas Vol. 18, Ton Koopman, Amsterdam Baroque Orchestra & Choir, Sandrine Piau, Klaus Mertens, Antoine Marchand 2003
 J. S. Bach: Cantatas for the Complete Liturgical Year Vol. 12: "Warum betrübst du dich, mein Herz" - Cantatas BWV 138 · 27 · 47 · 96, Sigiswald Kuijken, La Petite Bande, Gerlinde Sämann, Petra Noskaiová, Christoph Genz, Jan van der Crabben, Accent 2009
 J. S. Bach: Cantatas Vol. 47 – Cantatas from Leipzig 1723, Masaaki Suzuki, Bach Collegium Japan, Hana Blažíková, Peter Kooy, BIS 2010

References

Sources 
 
 Wer sich selbst erhöhet, der soll erniedriget werden BWV 47; BC A 141 / Sacred cantata (17th Sunday after Trinity ) Bach Digital
 Cantata BWV 47 Wer sich selbst erhöhet, der soll erniedriget werden history, scoring, sources for text and music, translations to various languages, discography, discussion, Bach Cantatas Website
 BWV 47 Wer sich selbst erhöhet, der soll erniedriget werden English translation, University of Vermont
 BWV 47 Wer sich selbst erhöhet, der soll erniedriget werden text, scoring, University of Alberta
 Luke Dahn: BWV 47.5 bach-chorales.com

Church cantatas by Johann Sebastian Bach
1726 compositions